

House of Bourbon

House of Orléans

Notes

 
Vendome